This is a list of MBEs awarded in the 1919 New Years Honours.
 
The 1919 New Year Honours were appointments by King George V to various orders and honours to reward and highlight good works by citizens of the British Empire. The appointments were published in The London Gazette and The Times in January 1919.

The recipients of honours are displayed here as they were styled before their new honour, and arranged by honour, with classes (Knight, Knight Grand Cross, etc.) and then divisions (Military, Civil, etc.) as appropriate.

Members of the Order of the British Empire (MBE)

Military Division
Royal Navy
1st Engineer Frank Ablett
Chief Boatswain George Hamilton Alexander
Gunner Charles Palmer Bennett
Paymaster Sub-Lieutenant Alfred Stephen Black, Royal Naval Reserve 
Warrant Ward Master Henry Budge
Acting Paymaster Lieutenant Henry John Cary, Royal Naval Reserve
Paymaster Sub-Lieutenant James Michael Diver, Royal Naval Reserve
Lieutenant Duncan McAuley Gracie, Royal Naval Volunteer Reserve
Quartermaster and Honorary Captain George Harrington, Royal Marines 
Chief Skipper Ernest William Hovells, Royal Naval Reserve
Lieutenant William Edward Long, Royal Naval Volunteer Reserve
Lieutenant Allan Macbeth, Royal Naval Volunteer Reserve
Warrant Shipwright Ernest Charles Miller
Paymaster Lieutenant James Walwyn Gynlais Morgan, Royal Naval Reserve
Skipper John Ernest Shepherd, Royal Naval Reserve
Warrant Victualling Officer Alfred Charles Waugh
Paymaster Sub-Lieutenant Hugh Brown Wilson, Royal Naval Volunteer Reserve
Skipper Walter Wooldridge, Royal Naval Reserve

Army

Major Percy Christopher Gallimore Hayward, Assistant Director of National Service, Norwich
Lieutenant William Edgcumbe Rendle, Director of Experiments, Mechanical Warfare (Overseas and Allies) Department, Ministry of Munitions
Captain David Inman Tod, Section Director, Accounts Department, Ministry of Munitions
Major Wyndham Frederick Tufnell, Voluntary Official, Canterbury, Ministry of National Service
Captain Lionel Arthur Frederick Verge, Assistant Inspector, Gun Ammunition (Supervisory), Woolwich Arsenal
Quartermaster and Captain Robert Frank Adams, Royal Army Service Corps
Quartermistress Doreen Allen, Queen Mary's Army Auxiliary Corps
Captain Rowland Alison Alston, 3rd Battalion, Northamptonshire Regiment
Lieutenant William Daniel Chamberlain Balls, 7th Battalion, Northumberland Fusiliers
Quartermaster and Lieutenant John Henry Adolphus Banger, Extra Regimentally Employed List
Captain Benjamin Croft Bayley, London Electrical Engineers
Captain Arthur Tetley Beazley, Gun Ammunition Filling Department, Ministry of Munitions
Temp Quartermaster and Captain John Evitt Bishop, Royal Field Artillery
Lieutenant Frederick Laurence Broad, Depot Officer, Central Stores Department, Ministry of Munitions
Quartermaster and Lieutenant Walter Peaston Britton, Extra Regimentally Employed List
Temp Lieutenant Henry Arthur Brooks, Special List
Temp Lieutenant John Rowe Brooks, Special List
Captain Arthur Walter Brown, 6th Battalion, West Yorkshire Regiment
Temp Quartermaster and Captain Charles Budd, Royal Army Veterinary Corps
Temp Lieutenant James William Budge, Special List
Captain Elias Wynne Cemlyn-Jones, 6th Battalion, Royal Welsh Fusiliers
Unit Administrator Marie Langslow Chapman, Queen Mary's Army Auxiliary Corps
Unit Administrator Beatrice L. Clay, Queen Mary's Army Auxiliary Corps
2nd Lieutenant Thomas Cooper, General List
Lieutenant Noel Harwood Cope, 5th Battalion, West Yorkshire Regiment
Captain Alexander Henry Cowan, General List Reserve
Recruiting Controller Muriel Craigie, Queen Mary's Army Auxiliary Corps
Lieutenant Edward Curry, Royal Field Artillery
Temp Captain Samuel Cursley, General List
Lieutenant Arthur Edward Desmond, Royal Engineers
Lieutenant William Edwards, Royal Dragoons
Captain Arthur Evelyn Paul Ellis, 3rd Battalion, Rifle Brigade
Lieutenant Thomas William Emerson, General List Reserve
Captain Robert Forrest, 5th Battalion, Bedfordshire Regiment
Lieutenant Percy Tom Freeman, Royal Engineers
Lieutenant Cecil Murdoch Gamage, Royal Engineers
Captain Alan Parry Gamier   Northumberland Fusiliers
Temp Captain Randolph G. Gethin, General List, late South Irish Horse
Quartermaster and Captain Robert Thomas Gough, Royal Engineers
Captain Donald Ernest Grant, Section Director, Gun Manufacture Department, Ministry of Munitions
Captain Sidney John Heath, Welsh Regiment
Honorary Temp Lieutenant Graham Hetherington, Royal Army Veterinary Corps
Captain Francis Holland, 10th Battalion, Liverpool Regiment
Temp Lieutenant Charles Geoffrey Holme, Royal Army Service Corps
Temp 2nd Lieutenant Hubert Jack Holmes   Special List
Captain Vernon Grove Horton, General List Reserve
Captain W. F. Hutchings, 29th Battalion, London Regiment
Captain Horace Swales Johnson, West Yorkshire Regiment
Quartermaster and Captain Harry Beresford Jones, Royal Defence Corps
Captain Edward William Kirkby, Special List
Temp Lieutenant Adrian Bernard L. Klein, Norfolk Regiment
Lieutenant E. C. Knapp, 3rd Battalion, Somerset Light Infantry
2nd Lieutenant Joseph Whittington Landon, Unattached List
Captain Francis Henry Lawrence, Royal Garrison Artillery
Lieutenant John Boyd Lawson, Royal Engineers
Unit Administrator Mary Lenegham, Queen Mary's Army Auxiliary Corps
Temp Lieutenant George Lister, General List
Unit Administrator Ethel Vernon Lloyd, Queen Mary's Army Auxiliary Corps
Lieutenant James Keith Macleod, Royal Field Artillery
Temp Captain John Newton Martin, Royal Army Medical Corps
Captain H. A. Meredith, Territorial Force Reserve
Quartermaster and Captain James Mitchell, Argyll and Sutherland Highlanders
Lieutenant Rhys Hopkin Morris, 2nd Battalion, Royal Welsh Fusiliers
Temp Captain Hugh A. Moutray-Read, Royal Army Service Corps
Captain James Calder Muirhead, T.F. Reserve
Temp Lieutenant Alexander Gordon Wynch Murray, Cambridge University Officers Training Corps
Temp Lieutenant Francis Clement Prideaux Naish, Royal Engineers
Quartermaster and Captain Thomas George Hull Nightingale, Royal Artillery
Temp Lieutenant Edward Joseph O'Kelly, General List
Quartermaster and Lieutenant Richard Oliver  4th Battalion, East Yorkshire Regiment
Temp Quartermaster and Captain Richard Owen, Royal Army Veterinary Corps
Quartermaster and Lieutenant John McDonald Patrick, 3rd Battalion, Cameron Highlanders
Captain Abraham William Pegrum, Royal Army Ordnance Corps
Captain William Gilbert Popplestone, Special List
Captain Donnell Shepard Post, General List Reserve
Captain George Henry Rayner, Royal Army Ordnance Corps
2nd Lieutenant Walter John Rayner, 4th Battalion, Royal Fusiliers
Temp Quartermaster and Captain Robert John Reeder, Royal Engineers
Lieutenant George Rennie, Special List Reserve
Captain Dudley Gerald Rix, Special List
2nd Lieutenant Joseph Saul, Royal Garrison Artillery
Captain James Scrimgeour, Special List
Captain John Gilson Shield, Special List
Quartermaster and Lieutenant William Solly, Royal Engineers
Lieutenant Albert Edward Springate, Royal Artillery
Lieutenant Herbert Alfred Stallan, Royal Artillery
Captain Hugh William Stirling, General List Reserve
Major John Stirling, Reserve
Lieutenant John William Storey, Reserve, General List
Recruiting Controller Gertrude M. H. Streeter, Queen Mary's Army Auxiliary Corps
Temp Lieutenant Herbert Alfred Stringer, Royal Army Ordnance Corps
Lieutenant Arthur Herbert Taylor, Army Gymnastic Staff
Captain Edward Joseph Waldron, Inspector of Army Schools
Temp Quartermaster and Captain Laurence Whattaker, Royal Army Medical Corps
Temp Captain William Wigham-Richardson, General List
Quartermaster and Captain John Wingfield Willsher, Royal Army Medical Corps
Temp Captain Thomas Woombell, Rifle Brigade
Overseas Military Forces of Canada
Lieutenant Joseph Harold-Watkins, General List
Lieutenant Sidney George Webb, Quebec Regiment
Australian Imperial Force
Honorary Major Arthur Cressy Barry, Australian Comforts Fund
Captain George King, 15th Battalion, Australian Imperial Force
Captain Eric Alfred Lee, 20th Battalion, Australian Imperial Force
Lieutenant Rupert Livingstone Mayman, 10th Battalion, Australian Imperial Force
Quartermaster and Honorary Captain Clarence Robert Murphy, General List
Quartermaster and Honorary Captain William Andrew Perrin, General List
Lieutenant William Price, 47th Battalion, Australian Imperial Force
Captain William Henry Prior, General List
Captain James Edmund Savage, Australian Army Service Corps
Administrative Headquarters of New Zealand
Quartermaster and Captain Henry Eastgate, New Zealand Rifle Brigade
Captain Gordon Harris Forsythe, New Zealand Field Artillery
Captain Norman Joseph Levien, New Zealand Army Ordnance Corps
Captain Donald Archibald McCurdy, New Zealand Army Postal Services
Captain Henry Edward McGowan, Canterbury Regiment
Captain Christopher Robert Alexander Magnay, New Zealand Rifle Brigade
Quartermaster and Captain Richard Charles Staples-Brown, New Zealand Medical Corps
Union of South Africa
Temp Captain Edmund Charles Kean Jamieson, South African Pay Corps
Temp Captain Eric Bolingbroke Walker   1st Battalion, South African Infantry and General List
Temp Captain James Cunningham Whyte, South African Native Labour Corps

For services rendered in connection with military operations in France and Flanders:
Acting Sister Isabella Eugenie Marie Barbier  Civil Hospital Reserve
Temp Lieutenant Henry Edward Beresford, Royal Engineers
Temp Quartermaster and Lieutenant James Ballentyne Binnie, 9th Gordon Highlanders
Temp Lieutenant Erie Bergo Brand, Royal Army Service Corps
Temp 2nd Lieutenant James Waugh Butters, General List
Unit Administrator Louisa Maud Chase, Queen Mary's Army Auxiliary Corps
Unit Administrator Ethel Robin Clowes, Queen Mary's Army Auxiliary Corps
Lieutenant Charles Dilworth, Officers Training Corps
Temp Lieutenant William Frederick Dobson, Royal Engineers
Temp Lieutenant Alan Gordon Dunell, Royal Army Service Corps
Unit Administrator Mary Sanderson Faviell, Queen Mary's Army Auxiliary Corps
Lieutenant Frederick Richard Gale, Royal Army Ordnance Corps
Temp Lieutenant Geoffrey Goodyear, Machine Gun Corps
Temp Lieutenant Herbert John Gough, Royal Engineers
Lieutenant Lionel Havercroft Green, 3rd South Wales Borderers
Temp Lieutenant Charles William Halliday, Royal Engineers
Temp Quartermaster and Lieutenant Charles Sweet Hampton   2nd Welsh Regiment
Temp Lieutenant Joseph Lawrence Harrison, Royal Army Ordnance Corps
Temp Lieutenant Roland John Heath, Royal Army Service Corps
Temp Quartermaster and Lieutenant Arthur Hill, General List
Assistant Administrator Cicely Lamorna Kingston, Queen Mary's Army Auxiliary Corps
Temp 2nd Lieutenant William Hogg, General List
Temp 2nd Lieutenant Harold Hopkinson, Royal Army Service Corps
Unit Administrator Elizabeth Houghton, Queen Mary's Army Auxiliary Corps
Temp 2nd Lieutenant John Archibald Hughes, General List
Unit Administrator Ethel Vivian Hyde, Queen Mary's Army Auxiliary Corps
Unit Administrator Annie Emily Blanche Johnston, Queen Mary's Army Auxiliary Corps
Lieutenant Francis Matthew Joyce   Royal Field Artillery
Quartermaster and Lieutenant William James Keery, 6th Nottinghamshire and Derbyshire Regiment
Assistant Administrator Miriam Constance Lambert, Queen Mary's Army Auxiliary Corps
Assistant Administrator Margaret Ruby Lutwyche, Queen Mary's Army Auxiliary Corps
Temp Lieutenant Murdo Mackenzie, attd. Cameron Highlanders
Temp Lieutenant Frank Charles Mallet, Royal Army Service Corps
Unit Administrator Clara Neale, Queen Mary's Army Auxiliary Corps
Temp Lieutenant William Albert Plowman, Labour Corps
Temp Quartermaster and Lieutenant William Proud, Manchester Regiment (late Durham Light Infantry)
Temp Lieutenant John Henry Rowlatt, Royal Army Service Corps
Assistant Administrator Molly Saunders, Queen Mary's Army Auxiliary Corps
Assistant Administrator Flora Murray Scott, Queen Mary's Army Auxiliary Corps
Quartermaster and Lieutenant Cornelius Shepherd, 2nd Battalion, West Riding Regiment
Temp Quartermaster and Captain George Robert Spring, Royal Army Medical Corps
Temp Lieutenant Ernest Phillips Foquet Sutton, Royal Army Service Corps
Unit Administrator Elizabeth Thomson, Queen Mary's Army Auxiliary Corps
Temp Lieutenant Harry Cuthbert William Wilkinson, General List
Temp Lieutenant Hugh Willett, Royal Engineers
Temp 2nd Lieutenant Edgar Arthur Wilman, Royal Engineers
Subadar Lachmi Narain, 72nd (U.P.) Indian Labour Company

Overseas Military Forces of Canada
For services rendered in connection with military operations in France and Flanders:
Honorary Captain Thomas Herbert Hutchinson, Canadian Young Men's Christian Association
Lieutenant Allan McLachlan, 87th Battalion, Quebec Regiment

Australian Imperial Force
Honorary Captain Alexander McCallum, Australian Comforts Fund
Lieutenant George Smith, Australian Engineers

For valuable services rendered in connection with Military Operations in Egypt:
Temp Lieutenant George Aitchison, Royal Army Service Corps
Temp Quartermaster and Lieutenant Walter James Baldwin, Royal Army Medical Corps
Lieutenant James Barber, Royal Warwickshire Regiment
2nd Lieutenant James Cecil Lawson Barnes, Honourable Artillery Company
Temp Lieutenant William Betts Blake, Royal Army Ordnance Corps
Temp Lieutenant Frank Henry William Bullock, Royal Army Service Corps
Temp Quartermaster and Lieutenant Frederick William Cudmore, Royal Army Medical Corps
Lieutenant Cyril Francis Douglas-White, Argyll and Sutherland Highlanders, Special Reserve, attd. Royal Army Ordnance Corps
Lieutenant Richard Endell Evans, Royal Engineers
Temp 2nd Lieutenant Charles Lionel Eyres, Royal Engineers
Temp Lieutenant Napier Paul Frampton, Royal Army Service Corps
Lieutenant Reginald Lowood Gardner, Manchester Regiment
Temp Lieutenant Gerald Gilbert Green, General List
Captain Joseph Green  Royal Army Medical Corps
Temp Quartermaster and Lieutenant William Green, Royal Engineers
Temp Quartermaster and Lieutenant Adolph Halin, Royal Engineers, Postal Section, Special Reserve
Lieutenant Philip Francis Hamilton-Grierson, Royal Scots Fusiliers
Temp 2nd Lieutenant William Ross Say, Royal Engineers
Temp Lieutenant Fred Holden, Royal Army Service Corps
Lieutenant Arthur Clement Hope, Scots Guards, Special Reserve
Lieutenant Thomas William Irons, Royal Army Ordnance Corps
Temp Lieutenant Arthur Henry Gould Kerry, Royal Engineers
Temp Lieutenant Frederick Lewis, Royal Army Service Corps
Lieutenant Thomas Clouston Rae MacGilvray, Argyll and Sutherland Highlanders, Special Reserve
Temp Lieutenant Donald Paton Malyn, Royal Army Service Corps
Captain Edgar James Merry, Welsh Regiment
Lieutenant Thomas Percy Prosser Powell, Montgomeryshire Yeomanry
Lieutenant Herbert Lee Sergeant, Royal Engineers
Temp Quartermaster and Lieutenant Arthur William Shreeve, Royal Army Medical Corps
Lieutenant Ernest William Slaughter, Royal Army Ordnance Corps
Lieutenant James Harnpstead Smith, Royal Scots
Lieutenant Ulric Doncaster Sowman, Royal Army Service Corps
Temp Lieutenant Ernest Algernon Stoddard, General List, attd. Royal Engineers, Signal Service
Lieutenant James Phillips Stratton, Royal Army Service Corps
Temp 2nd Lieutenant Sholto Douglas Major Wilson, Hampshire Regiment
Australian Imperial Force
Quartermaster and Honorary Captain Phillip Percival Buckland, 10th Australian Light Horse Regiment
Honorary Lieutenant Wilfred John Thomas Frost, Australian Imperial Force Canteens
Egyptian Army
For valuable services rendered in connection with Military Operations in Egypt:
El Saghkolagliasi Abdel Azim Effendi Abd El Kadi, 1st Battalion, Egyptian Army
El Mulazim-Awal Anwar Effendi Amer, 1st Battalion, Egyptian Army
El Yuzbashi Halim Effendi Sulman Shoucair, Medical Corps, Egyptian Army
El YuzbashiMohammed Effendi Akle, Egyptian Army
El Bimbashi Saleh Effendi Lufti, Egyptian Military Police

For services rendered in connection with Military Operations in Italy:
Temp Captain Lewis Adolphus Bampfield, General List
Temp Lieutenant Trevor Gaulter Benson, Royal Army Service Corps
2nd Lieutenant Lawrence Brown, Labour Corps
Temp Quartermaster and Lieutenant William Carlisle, 10th (S.) Battalion, Northumberland Fusiliers
Temp Lieutenant Oscar Bedford Daly, General List
Lieutenant Francis Edmund Gibson, Royal Field Artillery
Temp Lieutenant The Honourable Thomas Leopold McClintock-Bunbury, General List
Temp Lieutenant Frederic William Moss   Machine Gun Corps
Lieutenant Thomas Whately Rose   5th Battalion, Royal Sussex Regiment
Temp Inspector of Ordnance Machinery, John Smith, Royal Army Ordnance Corps
Lieutenant Frank Percival Twine   5th Battalion, Royal Sussex Regiment
Temp 2nd Lieutenant William Herbert Williams, 21st Battalion, Manchester Regiment
Temp Lieutenant Richard Linsley Young, 9th Battalion, South Staffordshire Regiment

For valuable services rendered in connection with Military Operations in Salonika:
Temp Lieutenant Geoffrey Charles Arrowsmith Bernays, Royal Engineers
Lieutenant Thomas Hugh Conolly Blaikie, Royal Field Artillery
Lieutenant Theodore Stephen Bliss   Royal Engineers
Temp Lieutenant Norton Breton, Special List
Lieutenant Hugh Franklin Clarke, Royal Garrison Artillery
Temp Lieutenant Henry Darlington Harold Court, Royal Engineers
Lieutenant William Knight Duckett, Royal Engineers
Temp Lieutenant Frederick Charles La Fontaine, General List
Lieutenant The Honourable David William Leslie-Melville, 2nd Lovat's Scouts Yeomanry
Lieutenant Reginald Anson Mansell  Royal Army Medical Corps
Temp Lieutenant William Mercer, Royal Army Service Corps
Temp Lieutenant Harold John Cooke Neobard, Special List
Temp Lieutenant Andreas Pallis, Special List
Temp Lieutenant John Ramsbottom, Royal Army Medical Corps
Temp Lieutenant Walter Deveson Reynolds, Royal Engineers
Lieutenant Thomas Buston Robson, Royal Garrison Artillery
Temp Lieutenant Gordon Stevens, Royal Engineers
Overseas Military Forces of Canada
Lieutenant John Hamilton Lane Johnstone, Canadian Engineers

For valuable services rendered in connection with Military Operations in North Russia:
Lieutenant A. E. Sturdy, Leicestershire Regiment
2nd Lieutenant A. Utterton, Royal Army Service Corps
Overseas Military Forces of Canada
Major R. B. S. Burton, 8th Canadian Infantry Battalion, Manitoba Regiment

Royal Air Force

Lieutenant George Philip Achurch
2nd Lieutenant John Leonard Adams 
2nd Lieutenant Arthur Dunscombe Allen
Lieutenant Henry Graeme Anderson
2nd Lieutenant Charles Attrill
2nd Lieutenant Harry James Bagge
Captain Edward Henry Bellew
Captain Walter Owen Bentley
Lieutenant Arthur William Brittain
Captain William Robert Bruce-Clarke
2nd Lieutenant Fernand Charles-Butler
Captain Leslie Wilden Carr
Lieutenant John Eric Catherall
Lieutenant John Harwood Catleugh
Captain Archibald Sidney Cheshire
Captain Fred Christie
Lieutenant John George Neilson Clift
Captain Herbert Prinsep Somers Clogstoun
2nd Lieutenant William Cole
Lieutenant Edgar Edmund Colquhoun
2nd Lieutenant James Henry Cooke
Captain Hugh George Corby
Captain William Percy Cort
Captain Reginald Aloysius Courtney
Lieutenant Keppel Archibald Cameron Creswell
Lieutenant Amos Allan Denison 
Captain William James Dew
Captain Ernest O. Drudge
Lieutenant Samuel Howard Ellis
Captain Samuel Denys Felkin
2nd Lieutenant John Herbert Ferguson
Lieutenant Walter Harrison Fielding
2nd Lieutenant Albert Edward Muspratt Fortescue
Captain George Gerald Rae Fraser
2nd Lieutenant Robert McGonnan Freemantle
2nd Lieutenant John Hunt Furniss
Captain Harold Gardiner-Hill
Captain Arthur Basil Wickham Greenhough 
Captain Arthur Leslie Gregory 
Captain Adolph Herbert Handman
Captain Albert Urbane Hansford
Captain William Whiddon Hart
2nd Lieutenant Wilfred Edward Graham Heanly
2nd Lieutenant Noel Hemsley
Captain Charles Goldby Hetherington
Lieutenant Alfred Kingston
2nd Lieutenant James Walter Hostings
Lieutenant Philip Charles Hoyland
Lieutenant Eric Beresford Humphries 
Lieutenant Robert Henry Humphreys
2nd Lieutenant John Hunter
Lieutenant Frederick Mitchell Iredale
2nd Lieutenant Maurice Jewison James
2nd Lieutenant Thomas Pargeter Jones
Captain Alfred Knight
Captain Edward Leonard Lauder
Lieutenant Alistair Lee
2nd Lieutenant Bernard Alexander Levey
2nd Lieutenant Walter Lienard
Lieutenant William Lingard
Lieutenant George Henry Hudson Lyall
Lieutenant William Hooker Lyall
Lieutenant Edgar Lyne
Captain Alister Pelham MacKilligan
2nd Lieutenant Robert Knox McLean
2nd Lieutenant John Alexander McMullen
Captain John Mitchell Mitchell
Lieutenant Edward Arthur Molyneux
Captain Stanley Robert Mullard
Lieutenant Herbert John Greatrex Newman
Captain Tom Douglas Hamilton Osborn
Lieutenant Alexander Rutherford Ovens
Lieutenant Thomas Arthur Peddell
Honorary Captain George Ramage
Captain John Victor Read
Captain Colin Spencer Richardson
Lieutenant Jacob Sutcliffe Ruttie
Captain Frederick William Scarff
Captain Walter Alfred Scoble
Lieutenant John Butterfield Sharpies
2nd Lieutenant James Henry Slater
Captain Alexander Glegg Smith 
Lieutenant Charles Hodgkinson Smith
Captain Henry Joseph Cecil Smith
Captain Robert Stephenson-Peach
Captain Robert Little Stevenson
2nd Lieutenant George John Stroud
Lieutenant James Henry Richardson Sutherland, Canadian Infantry
Lieutenant Henry Percy Tate
Captain Tom Whitaker Tattersall
2nd Lieutenant Charles Stuart Thompson
2nd Lieutenant George Albert Thompson
Captain Harry Tilley
Lieutenant Samuel Arthur Turner
Captain James Herbert Tyler
Captain Dudley Francis Upjohn
Lieutenant Émile Antoine Verpilleux
Captain Robert Bruce Waite
Captain John Philip Walker
Captain John Charles Watson
Captain William Thomas Webley
Lieutenant Herbert Gray Welsford
Captain Raymond Whitaker
2nd Lieutenant John Charles White
2nd Lieutenant Thomas Willis
Lieutenant Albert Thomas Edgar Witt
Lieutenant Charles Harry Witty
Lieutenant Christopher Harding Young

Women's Royal Air Force
Administrator Matilda Theresa Talbot
Assistant Administrator Marion Annie Thompson
Acting Assistant Commandant Olive Eleanore Tibbits
Superintendent Charlotte Bathasar Gething (Woking)

Civil Division

Katharine Acland, Secretary, Hertfordshire Branch, British Red Cross Society; Organiser of "Herts Day," "Our Day," etc.
Frank Adams, Photographic Department, Ministry of Information
John Adams 
Robert Ernest Kennedy Adams, Divisional Commander, Metropolitan Special Constabulary
Jean Reid Aitken, Training School for Teachers of Domestic Subjects, Preston
Edgar Alcock, Director ana Works Manager, The Hunslet Engine Company Limited
Stanley Walter Alexander, Ministry of Information
Arthur Joseph Allnutt, Surveyor, Department of the Administrator of Works and Buildings, Air Ministry
Emma Amor, Quartermaster of the Windsor Road Auxiliary Hospital, Barry, Glamorganshire
Annie Maria Anderson, Assistant to the Parliamentary and Financial Secretary, Ministry of Munitions
Charles Henry Andrews, Civil Engineer, Department of the Administrator of Works and Buildings, Air Ministry
Leonard Andrews, Progress Superintendent, Metropolitan Munitions Committee
Elsie Barbara Armitage, Honorary Secretary and Head of the British Soldiers' Institute, Boulogne
Captain George Arnold, Master of the Transport Rother
Matthew Mather Ascough, Chief Engineer, Mercantile Marine
Arthur Ashton, House Steward to the Lord Mayor of Newcastle
William Stacey Aslett  Medical Officer, Knighton Auxiliary Hospital, Leicestershire
Arthur Astin, Collector of Customs and Excise, Aberdeen
May Clara Crofton Atkins
Harold Waring Atkinson, Honorary Librarian, British Prisoners of War Book Scheme
George Ayrton, Hut Superintendent, Church Army, First-Army Area
Indiana Richenda Backhouse, Commandant, Lydney Auxiliary Hospital, Gloucestershire
William Baigent  Officer-in-Charge, Northallerton Auxiliary Hospital, Yorkshire
Ada Mary Baker, Salvation Army
Francis Livingstone Ball, Assistant Inspector of Carriages, Glasgow Area, Ministry of Munitions
Alice Liardet Ballantine, Quartermaster, Crag Head Auxiliary Hospital, Bournemouth
Eva Hermione, Lady Baring, Commandant, Northwood House Auxiliary Hospital, Cowes, Isle of Wight
Edith Madge Barling, Commandant, Mayfield Auxiliary Hospital for Officers, Birmingham
Henry Arthur Barlow, Staff Clerk, War Office
Captain William Tait Barlow, Assistant Director, Liner Department, New York Office, Ministry of Shipping
Edith Helen, Lady Barnes, Royal Air Force Aid Committee
Ada Barnett, Commandant, Kingswood Auxiliary Hospital; Quartermaster, Rust Hall Auxiliary Hospital, Tunbridge Wells
Sir Charles Burton Harrington  County Director, Auxiliary Hospitals and Voluntary Aid Detachments, Limerick
Lady Grace Barry, Vice-President, Eynesford Division, Norfolk Branch, British Red Cross Society; Organiser and Commandant of Reepham Auxiliary Hospital, Norfolk
John Armstrong Barry, Honorary Secretary, Dundee Branch, Incorporated Soldiers' and Sailors' Help Society
Gilbert William Barton, Works Manager, Messrs. Henry Bessemer & Company Limited
Henry Baker Bates  Mayor of St. Helens; Chairman, St. Helen's Advisory Committee, Ministry of National Service
Frederick William Batten, Second Division Clerk, Land Registry
George Richard Battle, Acting Electrical Engineer, Invergordon
Harry Percy Baxter, Steelworks Manager, Messrs. Edgar Allen & Company Limited
Marjorie Letitia Bazeley, Assistant Commandant, Northam Auxiliary Hospital, Devonshire
Lieutenant John James Beard, British Red Cross Transport Officer, Southampton
Herbert George Beazley, Section Director, Accounts Department, Ministry of Munitions
Muriel Grace Beddow, Supervisor, Mobilization Directorate, War Office
George Edward Bennett, Assistant to Secretary of Northern Region, Ministry of National Service
Isaac Vaughan Bennett, Naval Store Officer, H.M. Dockyard, Haulbowline
Charles William Best, National Service Representative, Brecon
Joseph Bintis, Manager, Ministry of Munitions Instructional Factory, Manchester
Janet Elizabeth Birch, Commandant, Filey Auxiliary Hospital
Jessie Bird, Joint Manager and Distributor, Red Cross Stores, Admiralty Pier, Dover
Henry Hodgkinson Bobart, Commandant, Red Cross Ambulance Column, Middlesex Branch, British Red Cross Society
Theodora Bosanquet, Secretary, Home Supplies Board, and Personal Assistant to Second Secretary, Ministry of Food
George Bourn, Manager with Coventry Ordnance Works Limited
Thomas Bowen  Farmer
James Robert Bowman, Administrative Assistant, Milk Supplies Branch, Ministry of Food
Adam Boyce, Waterguard Superintendent, Port of Liverpool
Elliot Bradden, Representative in Hong Kong of the Finance Branch, Ministry of Shipping
The Reverend Westby R. Brady, Senior Chaplain to the Mission to Seamen, Buenos Aires
George Sandison Brock  British Red Cross Hospital, Italy
Herbert Cecil Brocklehurst, Assistant Inspector, Ministry of Munitions, U.S.A.
Marial Brodie, Matron of St. John Hospital, Stabon Heath, Llanelly
Annie Kathleen Brown, Assistant in Foreign Department, Ministry of Information
James Brown, Chief Engineer, Mercantile Marine
Minnie Brown, Commandant, Women's Voluntary Aid Detachment, South-port, Lancashire
Mary Brumell, Quartermaster, 5th Northumberland Auxiliary Hospital
John William Bullock, Chief Examiner, Exchequer and Audit Department
Margaret Annie Bullock, Chief Clerk, Tribunal Department, Oxford, Ministry of National Service
Nellie Bunker, Superintendent, Shorthand and Typing Section, War Cabinet Secretariat
Alison Burley, British War Mission in U.S.A.
Norah Dalrymple Burns, Assistant in Finance Department, Ministry of Information
Henry Robert John Burstall, Sub-Section Director, High Explosives Contracts, Ministry of Munitions
Frances Westbrook Burton, Norfolk Prisoners of War Help Association
Helen Ethel Bush, Voluntary Worker, Hospital Bag Fund
Maud Alice Bushby, Staff Quartermaster and Head of Returned Members Department, Joint Women's Voluntary Aid Detachment, Department, British Red Cross and Order of St. John
Marjorie Alma Butcher, Assistant Principal and Secretary to Director, Women's Royal Naval Service
John Lawrence Butler, Chief Foreman, Breech Mechanism Shop, Messrs. Wm. Beardmore and Company Limited
Nina Butler, Wounded and Missing Enquiry Department, British Red Cross Society
George Eskholme Buttenshaw, Sectional Engineer, Department of Engineering, Ministry of Munitions
Edward Buxton, Ministry of Shipping
Laura Buxton, Commandant of Catton Hall Auxiliary Hospital, Norwich
Ernest Henry Byatt, Temporary Assistant, Commercial Branch, Ministry of Shipping
Emma Mary Byles, Late Matron, Lambeth Infirmary, The Lady Angela Mary Alice Campbell, Commandant, St. John's Auxiliary Hospital, Sevenoaks, Kent
Vera Harriett Antill Campbell, Assistant Establishment Omcer, Ministry of Information
Captain Robert Edward Carey, Master Mariner, South, Eastern and Chatham Railway Company
Rose Catharine Clanmorris Caetell, Lady Superintendent, Y.M.C.A. Town Centres, Havre
Constance Helena Chaplin, Commandant, West Dene Auxiliary Hospital, St. Leonard's-on-Sea
Julia Chatterton, Red Cross Work, Egypt
Frederic Brandon Cheshire, Inspector at a National Shell Factory
Hugh Thomas Arthur Chidgey, Divisional Commander, Metropolitan Special Constabulary
Major Thomas Henry Church, Late Works Manager at an Explosives Factory. For courageous conduct on the occasion of a serious fire.
Laura Churchill, Commandant, Woodlawn Auxiliary Hospital, Didsbury, Manchester
Frederick Septimus Clay, Clerk to Nuneaton Local Tribunal
Harry Clayton, Section Director, Accounts Department, Ministry of Munitions
Elizabeth Clegg, Royal Dublin Fusiliers Prisoners of War Fund
Katherine Elizabeth Cochrane, Clerk, Foreign Office
James Wearne Cock, Assistant Director of Tea Supplies, Ministry of Food
Elizabeth Violet Colegrave, Commandant of Princess Christian Auxiliary Hospital, South Norwood
Frances May Coleridge, Clerk in His Britannic Majesty's Legation, Copenhagen
Ellen Evelyn Collins, in Charge of County of London Collecting Box Department, British Red Cross and Order of St. John
Lesbia Collins, Clerical Staff, Wheat Export Company
Gilbert Edmond Chalmers Colona, National Service Officer
Major John Compton  Postmaster, Folkestone
Matthew Connolly, Higher Division Clerk, H.M. Office of Works
William Frederick Connolly, Staff Clerk, Finance Department, Air Ministry
William James Connor, Chief Registrar, Admiralty
Robert Llewellvn Wilson Cooper, Head of Telegraph Section, Ministry of Shipping
Rvbil Florence Corkran, Voluntary Worker, Officers' Families' Fund
Clifford John Cottle, Secretary, Church Army Friends of the Wounded
Alonzo Cotton, Superintendent, City of Bristol Corps, St. John Ambulance Brigade
Constance Louise Cox, Donor and Administrator, Stone House Red Cross Depot, Godalming, Surrey
Sydney Cox, British Red Cross Commission, Mesopotamia
Howard Wilfred Crack, Technical Assistant, Iron and Steel Production Department, Ministry of Munition Henry Crombie, Acting Staff Clerk, Secretary's Department, Admiralty
Victor Crooke, Executive Officer, Walsall Borough Food Control Committee
Bertram Charles Cross, Acting Staff Clerk, H.M. Office of Works Audrey Crossley, Superintendent, Cable Department, British War Mission in U.S.A.
James Culross  Medical Officer in Charge, Newton Abbot Auxiliary Hospital, Devonshire
James Fraser Cunninghame, Assistant to Sub-Commissioner, Trade Exemptions, Scottish Region, Ministry of National Service
Benjamin Henry Curnow, Furniture Clerk, Board of Works, Dublin
Gertrude Barclay Currie, Granton Minesweepers' Hut
Captain William John Dale, Master of the Transport Archangel
Alphonso William James Davies, Accountant, Greenwich Hospital Department, Admiralty
John Ho well Davies, Secretary, Carmarthen War Savings Committee
Milfred Lucy Davies, Volunteer Worker, Australian Red Cross, Egyptian Expeditionary Force
Helen Frances Dawes, Head of Registry, Eastern Mediterranean Special Intelligence Bureau, Egyptian Expeditionary Force
Edward George Dean, Machine Tools Department, Ministry of Munitions
Rose Elinor Deedes, Honorary Secretary, Finsbury Local War Pensions Sub-Committee
Rosalind Mary Denny, Wounded and Missing Enquiry Department, British Red Cross Society
Marie Devonshire, Red Cross Work, Egypt
Gladys Helen Dick, Welfare Supervisor at a National Projectile Factory
Frances Joan Dickinson, British Red Cross Central Prisoners of War Committee
Elizabeth Amy Dixon, Labour Department, Ministry of National Service
John William Dodd, First Class Surveyor of Taxes, Inland Revenue
Annie Dowbiggin  Matron, Edmonton Military Hospital
Eva Duggan, Confidential Secretary to the President, Ordnance Committee, Ministry of Munitions
Elsie EppieJow Duncan, Royal Scots Association
Elizabeth Dorothea Dunlop, United Army and Navy Board
James Dunne, Chief Superintendent, Dublin Metropolitan Police
Terence Armiston Stewart-Dyer, Inspecting Engineer in U.S.A.,  Railway Materials Department, Ministry of Munitions
Alfred Ernest East, Metropolitan Special Constabulary (Observation Service)
Morton Frederick Eden, For services with the British Expeditionary Force, Salonika
Alice Edgar, Matron, Rarnsgate General Hospital and Seamen's Infirmary
Elizabeth Edmunds, Chief Lady Welfare Superintendent at one of H.M. Factories
John Parry Edmunds, Inspector, Glamorgan Special Constabulary
Gladys Maude Edwards, Personal Assistant to the Secretary, Ministry of Food
Richard Edwards, Suffolk Prisoners of War Committee
William John Eldridge, Secretarial Branch, Coal Mines Department, Board of Trade
Kathleen Frances Elizabeth Ellery, Joint Manager and Distributor, Red Cross Stores, Admiralty Pier, Dover
George Stanley Ellis, Temporary Assistant, Ship Management Branch, Ministry of Shipping
Agnes Louisa Evans, Assistant Commandant, Roseneath Auxiliary Hospital, Wrexham
Elias Ewen, Manager, Boiler Shop, Messrs. Swan, Hunter & Wigham Richardson, Limited, Newcastle
Amy Helena Margaret Fairbank, Chief Woman Technical Assistant, Ministry of National Service
Henry Edward Farmer, Chief Architectural Assistant, National Shipyards
The Reverend George Erie Farren  Secretary, No. 8 Red Cross Hospital, Boulogne, France
Ethel Bessie Feiling, Assistant in Establishment Branch, Ministry of Food
Marion Isobel Fell, Organiser and Commandant, Fairview Auxiliary Hospital, Ulverston
Victoria Shaw Fetherstonhaugh, Voluntary Worker, Australian Red Cross, Egyptian Expeditionary Force
George Thomas Fidler, Deputy Head of Cross Channel and Mediterranean Troops and Stores Section, Military Sea Transport Branch, Ministry of Shipping
Mabel Clara Hawkes Field, Commandant, Whytesgates Auxiliary Hospital, Stratford-on-Avon
Ruby Norah Figgis, Voluntary Aid Detachment, Chauffeuse, Boulogne Headquarters, British Red Cross Society
Charles Lavington Filder, Deputy Surveyor of Lands, Admiralty
James Arthur Findlay  Honorary Secretary, Ayrshire Branch, Scottish Branch, British Red Cross Society
Eliza Mary Forbes, Assistant Commandant, Chudleigh Auxiliary Hospital, Devonshire
Ernest Foreshew, Ex-soldier Clerk, War Office
Walter St. John Fox, Divisional Commander, Metropolitan Special Constabulary
Captain Harry Edwin Fozard, Aeronautical Inspection Department, Ministry of Munitions
Reginald France, Deputy Superintendent, Tools and Gauges, at a National Factory, Ministry of Munitions
Percy Alexander Francis, Agricultural Inspector, Board of Agriculture for Scotland
James Fraser, Outside Erector, Messrs. Sir Wm. Arrol and Co., Ltd.
Dorothy Friend, Ministry of Information
Alexander Moffitt Fullerton, Sailors' and Soldiers' Club, Dublin
Agnes Lottie Gallaway, Convener, War Hospital Supply Depot, Jedburghy Roxburghshire
Lieutenant Bernard Vincent Gander, Demonstrator, Sheffield University Discharged Officers' Training School, Ministry of Labour
Alice Marie Gardiner, London Special Constabulary (Observation Service)
Dorothy Gardner, Lady Worker, Y.M.C.A., Abancourt and Rouen
The Honourable Hylda Maria Madeline Garforth, Organiser and Commandant, Brompton Auxiliary Hospital, Yorkshire; late Organiser and Commandant, Lady Sykes' Auxiliary Hospital, Eddlethorpe
Lizzie Garner, Commandant, Auxiliary Hospital, Newark
James Charles Garrett, Accountant, British Red Cross Society
Eleanor Gask, Secretary, St. Bartholomew's Ladies' Guild
Catharine Julia Gaskell, Commandant, St. Chad's Auxiliary Hospital, Cambridge
Marguerite Gaussen, Catholic Club, Abbeville
Robert Gentle, Accountant to the Scottish Education Department, Edinburgh
Arthur Hereford Wykeham-George, Assistant Director of War Supplies, British War Mission in U.S.A.
George Prowse Gilchrist, Acting Staff Clerk, H.M. Office of Works
William James Gillespie, Farmer
Emily Girdlestone
Marjorie Girling, Lady Clerk, Finance Department, War Office
Ethel Dorothy Gladwell, Assistant in Articles Section, Ministry of Information
Olive Glanfield, Ministry of National Service 
Captain Robert Glegg, Master, Mercantile Marine
James Hutchison Glen, Manager of Dock and Repairs Department, Messrs. Vickers, Limited
Francesca Gluckstein
George Henry Gordon, Chief Assistant to Director of Cross-Channel Transportation and Coal Controller, Ireland
Sophia Augusta Graham, Late Commandant-in-Charge, Claremont Auxiliary Hospital; Commandant, Scourbank Auxiliary Hospital, Cumberland
Alexander Philip Foulerton Grant, Sub-Section Director, Military Establishment, Ministry of Munitions
Alice Gray
Andrew Gray, Works Manager, The Lanarkshire Steel Company Limited
Stanley Haldane Linford Greaves, Section Director, Factory Audit and Costs Department, Ministry of Munitions
Margaret Bennett Green, Honorary Lady Almoner, Royal Naval Hospital, Chatham; Naval Representative, Gillingham War Pensions Committee
George Frederick Greenham, Assistant Superintending Engineer, General Post Office
John Gregory, First Class Surveyor of Taxes, Inland Revenue
John Grimes, Honorary Treasurer of St. Pierre and Dynes House Auxiliary Hospitals, Cardiff
Edith Katharine Le Gros, Head of British Red Cross Knitting Department
Woodman Cole Grose, Staff Clerk, Finance Department, War Office
Lady Mabel Florence Mary Grosvenor, Organiser of Y.M.C.A. Munition Canteens
Helen Frances Hartopp Gubbins, Organiser of British Red Cross Working Parties, Cork
Agneta Annie Justina Stepney Gulston, Assistant County Secretary, Carmarthenshire Branch, British Red Cross Society
Sarah Gamzee Gurney, Organiser and Commandant, Ingham Auxiliary Hospital, Norfolk
Charles Brazier Hams, Acting Deputy Naval Store Officer, Admiralty
Evelyn Alice Hall, Organiser of Rest Station at Stourbridge, Worcestershire
Ernest Frederick Hall, Acting Deputy Accounts Officer, Admiralty
Margaret Gordon Hans Hamilton, War Workers' Welfare Committee, Y.W.C.A.
Ivy Winifred Hankins, Assistant Secretary to Deputy Controller of Armament Production, Admiralty
William Henry Hare, Minor Staff Clerk, Board of Education; Establishment Officer, National War Savings Committee
Charles Hubert Harris, Quartermaster in charge of Transport for the Salisbury Hospitals
Helen Harris, Assistant in Rationing Sub-Division, Ministry of Food
Marjorie Maxwell Harris, Hull and East Riding Prisoners of War Fund
Charles Henry Hawes, Ex-soldier Clerk, War Office
James Waldegrave Hayes, Divisional Secretary, Y.M.C.A., Essex
Herbert Harry Thomas Head, Private Secretary to Assistant Financial Secretary, Ministry of Munitions
John Henry Heath, Staff Clerk, Finance Department, Air Ministry
Marion Heelis, Commandant-in-Charge of Auxiliary Hospital, Appleby, Westmorland
Charles Allen Henderson 
Hubert Douglas Henderson, Secretary, Cotton Control Board
Laura Catharine Henderson, Naval Intelligence Division, Admiralty
Violet Henderson, Honorary Superintendent of a National Factory Canteen
The Honourable Sylvia Laura Henley, Organiser of Y.M.C.A. Munition Canteens
George Henshilwood, Post Office Executive Engineer, South-Eastern District
Thomas Hepburn, Member of Appeal Tribunal for Stirling, Dumbarton and Clackmannan
Caroline Herford, Commandant, Rest Station, Mayfield, Lancashire
Reginald Hewett, Chief Accountant, Royal Commission on Sugar Supply
Edwin Percy Hewkin, Head of Sugar Shipments Section, Commercial Branch, Ministry of Shipping
Ivy Lenore Heywood, Junior Administrative Assistant, Ministry of Shipping
Corona Hicks, Divisional Superintendent, Soldiers' Awards Branch, Ministry of Pensions
William Thomas Highton, Accountant, Surrey Auxiliary Hospitals
Gertrude Mary d'Arcy-Hildyard, Scottish Churches Huts, Boulogne
George Grimmer Hilton, Temporary Civilian Supervising Clerk, War Office
Charles Kenneth Hobson, Chief Assistant, General Economic Department, Board of Trade
William Edward Hobson, Assistant Registrar, Colonial Office
Lillie Hodgson, Junior Administrative Assistant, Ministry of National Service
Anne Avery Hoffmann, Chairman of Ladies' Committee of Soldiers and Sailors Dependants Committee, Leeds
Major Daniel de Hoghton, National Service Representative, Hampshire Area
Ethel Mary Holden, Vice-President, Staffordshire Branch, British Red Cross Society; Organiser of Red Cross Working Depot, Walsall, Staffordshire
Arthur William Holloway, Clerk, Local Government Board
Constance Holt, Hydrographic Department, Admiralty
Captain Frederick William Holt, Master Mariner, London and South Western Railway Company
Francis William Hooper, Superintending Pharmacist, Royal Victoria Yard, Deptford
Alexis Hore, Lady Clerk, War Office
Sidney Adolph Horstmann, Managing Director, Horstmann Cars Limited
Percy Thomas Horton, First Class Surveyor of Taxes, Inland Revenue
Ethel Mary Beatrice How
John Palmer Howard, Assistant National Secretary, Y.M.C.A. 
George Hoyle  Commandant, The Plains and Brooksbank Auxiliary Hospital, Elland
Frances Hughes, Late Matron of No. 1 House, St. Dunstans
Gibbard Richard Hughes, Managing Director, Hyposol Limited
Lizzie Huish, Salvation Army
Gertrude Cecilia Hullett, Employment Department, Ministry of Labour
Hilda Gertrude Overs Hulse, Commandant, Duffield Road Auxiliary Hospital, Derby
George Oscar Humphreys, General Distribution Branch, Coal Mines Department, Board of Trade
John Henry Hunter, Assistant Director, Frozen Beef and Provisions Department, New York Office, Ministry of Shipping
Frances Catherine Maude Haynes Hutchinsan, Voluntary work in connection witH recruiting
Helen Duguid Hutchison, Commandant of St. John Auxiliary Hospital, Newcastle upon Tyne
Henry Scott Huxley, Temporary Second Class Clerk, Colonial Office
Annie Christease Iles, Superintendent of Hostels, Ministry of Munitions
Isabella Edith Impey, Clerk, Ministry of National Service
Walter George Inglis, Herbert James Ireland, District Engineer, H.M. Office of Works
Margaret Douglas-Irvine, London War Pensions Committee
Douglas Arthur John Jackman, Secretary, Y.M.C.A., Boulogne Area
William Henry Congreve Jackson, Managing Director, Messrs. Thomas Webb & Sons
Dudley William Henry James, Metropolitan Special Constabulary (Observation Service)
Herbert William James, Legal Assistant, Timber Supplies Department, Board of Trade
Lottie, Lady Jarmay, Vice-President, Northwich Division, British Red Cross Society; Officer-in-Charge, The Ley Auxiliary Hospital, Winnington, Cheshire
Georgina Martha Jebb, Commandant, Auxiliary Hospital, Leantwardine, Herefordshire
Isabel Blanche Jeeves, Wounded and Missing Enquiry Department, British Red Cross Society
Marguerite Jefferies
Edward James Jeffrey, Acting First Class Assistant Accountant, Finance Department, War Office
Frances Edith Jenkins, Signal Division, Admiralty
Captain Jenkin Jenkins, Master, Mercantile Marine
Ida Jennings, Commandant, Abington Avenue Auxiliary Hospital, Northampton
Frederick Horace Oldershaw Jerram, Clerk, Local Government Board
Dorothy Johnson, Assistant Commandant, Sandon Hall Auxiliary Hospital, Weston, Stafford
Edith Clara Johnson, Secretary, Kensington War Savings Committee
John Ben Johnson, Organiser and Head of the Baling Voluntary Aid Detachment
Violet Charlotte Johnson, Organiser and Donor of Marsh Court Auxiliary Hospital, Stockbridge
Violet Seymour Johnson, Donor and Administrator of Ashton Hayes Auxiliary Hospital, near Chester
John Ewing Johnston, Veterinary Officer in Charge, Remount Depot, Belfast
Mary Ingharn Johnston, Honorary Secretary, Leith Local War Pensions Committee
Ethel Rose Johnstone, Honorary Organising Superintendent, Richmond War Hospital Supply Depot
Frances Lucy Johnstone, British War Mission in U.S.A.
Margaret Ellen Jones, Executive Officer, Amlwch Food Control Committee
Ann Laugharne Phillips Griffith Jones, Welfare Supervisor at a National Shell Factory
Reginald Bence-Jones  Assistant in Labour Supply Department, Ministry of National Service
Acting-Paymaster Thomas Lionel Jones  Liner Requisitioning Section, Ministry of Shipping
William Tudor Jones, Chief Inspector at a National Shell Factory
William Ezra Jordan, Salvation Army
Captain George William Joy, Master of the Transport Albano
Edward Kay, Works Manager, Messrs. Thomas Firth & Sons, Limited
Dorothy Clarissa Keeling, Acting General Secretary, National Association of Guilds of Help; Secretary of the Joint Committee on Social Service
Virginia Margaret Kemble, Commandant, Auxiliary Hospital, Chelmsford
James Hutchison Kennedy, Chief Draughtsman, Messrs. Hamilton & Co.,  Port Glasgow
Hilda Mary Kentish, Commandant, Registrar, and Honorary Treasurer of Wycombe Auxiliary Hospital, Buckinghamshire
Ida Clementina Kentish, Commandant, Englethwaite Auxiliary Hospital, Armathwaite, Cumberland
Frederick Charles Knibb, Examiner of Technical Accounts, Contracts Section, Department of the Administrator of Works and Buildings, Air Ministry
Ada Lacey, Post Office Prisoners of War Relief Fund
Frank Harper Lambourn, Acting Superintendent Victualling Store Officer, H.M. Dockyard, Haulbowline
Evelyn Hamar Laming, Organiser, Donor and Commandant of Auxiliary Hospital, Alresford, Hampshire
Richard Gilbert Lander, Staff Section, Department of the Administrator of Works and Buildings, Air Ministry
Sidney Montem Lander, Secretary and Executive Officer, War Agricultural Executive Committee for Worcestershire
Jessie Eleanor Langston, Superintendent of Registry, Appointments Department, Ministry of Labour
Captain Robert James Large, Master of the Transport Caesarea
George Latham  Head Clerk, Leave Section, War Office
Maud Lattey, Red Cross Work, Egypt
Laura Jessie Law, Secretary, St. John Ambulance Warehouse
Thomas David Lawrence, Executive Officer, Rhondda Food Control Committee
Frederick John Leaver, British Red Cross Central Prisoners of War Committee
Jane Creagh Leighton, Quartermaster, Naunton Park Auxiliary Hospital, Cheltenham
Arthur Trevor O'Bryen Leslie, Divisional Commander, Metropolitan Special Constabulary
Leontine Isabelle Emmeline Lester, Clerk, Foreign Office
Isabella Marion Lewin, Commandant, St. Mary's Auxiliary Hospital, Bromley, Kent
John Mackinlay Ligat, Head of East Lancashire British Red Cross Depot
C. H. Lightfoot, Honorary Secretary, Kobe British Women's Patriotic League
Henry John Lile, Master of a Trinity House Vessel
William Thomas Limming, Quartermaster, Red Cross Stores Department, Boulogne, France
Iris le Strange Lindsell, Secretary to the Honorary Organiser, Camps Library
The Reverend Irvine Lister, South Lancashire Regiment Prisoners of War Committee
James Mason Little, Officer-in-Charge, Stormont House Auxiliary Hospital, Downs Park Road, London
Fred Lloyd, Inspector of Markets and Grading, Live Stock Branch, Ministry of Food
Arthur William Long, District Superintendent, Materials and Priority Department, Admiralty
Rose Frances Lowman, Confidential Shorthand Typist to Third Sea Lord, Admiralty
William Watt Lumsden, Superintendent, Cordite Department, at one of Nobel's Explosive Company's Factories
Isabella Romanes Lyon, Organiser of Red Cross Working Parties, North Berwick
John Corbet McBride, Accident Manager, Commercial Union Assurance Company
John William Henry McCarthy, Master of a Trinity House Vessel
Sarah Georgina Corbetta McClellan, County Secretary, British Red Cross Society, Brecknockshire
William Ethrington Mace, Administrative Officer, Inspection Department, Ministry of Munitions, Canada 
Barbara Macklin, Queen Mary's Needlework Guild
Thomas Finlay Maclean, Senior Staff Clerk, Land Division, Board of Agriculture for Scotland
Miss McLean, Valparaíso
John Love McNaughton  Town Clerk, Buckle; Executive Officer of Local Food Control Committee
Mary Bridget McNeile, Wounded and Missing Enquiry Department, British Red Cross Society
Thomas McPherson, Chief Draughtsman, Wallsend and Slipway Engineering Company
Bessie McRae, Superintendent of a National Factory Canteen and Principal of a Canteen Workers' Training Centre
Maryel Alpina Magruder, Head Supervisor, Royal Naval Cordils Factory
George Edgar Maleham, Honorary Secretary, Sheffield Division, Soldiers' and Sailors' Families Association
Walter George Mann, Anchors and Cables Section, Materials and Priority Department, Admiralty
Anne Massie, Scottish War Savings Office, Edinburgh
Agnes Jessie Mauvan, Secretary to Priority Committee, Ministry of Munitions
Lilian Edith Mawby, Commandant, Dallington House Auxiliary Hospital, Northampton
Marion Winefrid Maxwell, Junior Administrative Assistant, Ministry of Shipping
Irene Harriet Bourne Seaburne Bourne-May, Joint Honorary Secretary, Hospital Bag Fund
Walter Baillie May, Secretary's Department, Admiralty
George Healey Meakin, Borough Treasurer, Islington; Executive Officer, Islington Food Control Committee
Mary Kidgway Meakin, Commandant, St. Joseph's Hall Auxiliary Hospital, Stone, Staffordshire
Captain Herbert Medcalf, Works Engineer, Royal Aircraft Establishment, Ministry of Munitions
Elizabeth Muriel Grant-Meek, Organiser of Working Parties, Wiltshire
Alexander Horsburgh Merriles, Production Department, British War Mission in U.S.A.
Henry Edward Dilke Merry, Assistant Inspector of Guns, Birmingham District, Ministry of Munitions
Muriel Hermione Marion Mervyn, Private Secretary to Director of Cross-Clrannel Transportation, Ireland
Marie Michaelis, Superintendent of Domestic Subjects under the Local Education Authority, Staffordshire
John Middlemiss, Executive Officer, Glasgow Food Control Committee
Joan Middleton, Temporary Registrar, Ministry of Shipping
John William Midgley, Chairman, Keighley Borough Food Control Committee
Henry Stephen Miles, Secretary to the Admiral Superintendent, Tyne District
Henry Horatio Millar 
Helena Mary Milligan
Janet Melanie Ailsa Mills, Lady Clerk in Military Operations Directorate, War Office
Louise Emilia Monck, Commandant, Heatherside Auxiliary Hospital, Crowthorne, Wellington College, Berkshire
Herbert Joseph Moore, Secretary to the Sub-Committee for Overseas Ambulance Trains
Harold Roland Morgan, Manager of a National Shell Factory, Ministry of Munitions
Robert Upton Morgan, Staff Clerk, War Office
Florence Mildred Morrison, Commandant, Duffield Auxiliary Hospital, Derbyshire
Robert Richardson Mortimer, Chief Draughtsman, The Staveley Coal and Iron Company Limited
The Honourable Katharine Charlotte Elizabeth Stewart Muirhead, Vice-President, Fochabers District, Morayshire Branch, Scottish Branch, British Red Cross Society
William Charles Mundy, Assistant Commandant and Honorary Treasurer, St. Fagan's Auxiliary Hospital, near Cardiff
John Murch, Secretary, Shipwrecked Mariners' Society, Holyhead
Ellen Theodora, Lady Murphy, Voluntary Worker, Clothing Branch, Officers' Families Fund
Maud Kathleen Frances Neame, Commandant, The Mount Auxiliary Hospital, Faversham, Kent
Katherine Helen Neilson, Founder and Chief Supporter of Flounders' College Auxiliary Hospital, Yorkshire
Evelyn Helen Johnston New, Travelling, Passport and Personnel Department, British Red Cross Society
Susan Newton, Organiser and late Commandant, Britannia Auxiliary Hospital, Whalley Range, Manchester
Captain Thomas Nicholson, Master of the Transport, Newtownards
Thomas Alexander Nicoll, Temporary Assistant in Wheat Section, Commercial Branch, Ministry of Shipping
Thomas Herbert Nightingale, Headmaster, St. George's, Wellington Street, Council School, Salford
Eleanor Millicent Norton, Commandant, Ditchling Auxiliary Hospital, Hassocks, Sussex
Jessie Jane Jardine Norton, Queen Mary's Needlework Guild
Owen James Oakshett, Chief Accountant, Metropolitan Munitions Committee
John O'Byrne, Temporary Assistant, Finance Branch, Ministry of Shipping
Major Richard Grainger Dennis O'Callaghan, Irish Recruiting Council
Alice Ogden, Quartermaster and Secretary, Elmfield Hall Auxiliary Hospital, Accrington, Lancashire
Charlotte Oliver, Honorary Secretary, Birkenhead Division, Soldiers' and Sailors' Families Association
Frederick Brook Orman, Surveyor of Stores, Rosytti
Ida Grace Victoria Orpen, Lady Superintendent, Inspection Department, Liverpool Area, Ministry of Munitions
Major David Osborne  Honorary Secretary, County of Fife Branch, Scottish Branch, British Red Cross Society
William Charles Guzman, Joint Managing Director, Lord Roberts Memorial Workshops
Frederick William Owen, Confidential Shorthand Writer, War Cabinet
Thomas Owen, Manager, Llanelly Employment Exchange
James Page, Assistant County Director and Organiser, St. John's Ambulance Brigade, South Shields
William Charles Page, Section Leader and Joint Honorary Secretary, Transport Department, East Lancashire Branch, British Red Cross Society
Thomas Abbott Painter, Assistant County Director and Joint Voluntary Aid Organiser, Middlesex Branch, British Red Cross and Order of St. John
Nellie Hurcomb Palmer, Lady Superintendent, Regimental Pay Office, Exeter
Frederick Richard Pascoe  Secretary, War Agricultural Executive Committee for Cornwall
Captain Thomas Paterson, Master of the Transport Hunsgate
Herbert Alfred James Pawson, Chief Clerk, Recruiting Branch, Ministry of National Service
The Reverend Francis Reginald Chassereau Payne, Leicestershire and Rutland Prisoners of War Committee
William Sidney Pearce, Chief Inspector of Mines, Admiralty
William Heath Peek, Master of Works at a National Projectile Factory
Richard Penny, Staff Clerk, Scottish Office
Sydney Perkins, Assistant Architect, First Class, H.M. Office of Works
Louise Pauline Perot, Secretary to the Mechanical Warfare (Overseas and Allies) Department, Ministry of Munitions
Ethel Maud Phillimore, Quartermaster, Standish Auxiliary Hospital, Stonehouse, Gloucestershire
Alexander John Philip, Assistant Executive Officer, Gravesend Food Control Committee
Eric Taylor Phillips, Commissioner to the Church Army in the Second Army
Margaret Phillips, Y.M.C.A. Lady Worker at Staples
Harold Percy Philpot, Technical Adviser for Canned Fish Trades, Ministry of Food
Thomas Philpot  Clerk, Local Government Board
Evelyn Chapman Philps, Work Supervisor of Women, Associated Equipment Co., Ltd.
Edward Llewellyn Pickles, Chief Examiner to the Air Inventions Committee
William John Percy Player  Chairman of the Committee, St. John's Auxiliary Hospital, Clydach, Glamorganshire
Edmund Arthur Norman Pochin, Manufacturer of rifle gauges
Harold Nichols Pochin, The British United Shoe Trading Company
Major Frederick Ernest Pollard, Sub-Section Director, Technical Department, Aircraft Production, Ministry of Munitions
Louise Rosemary Kathleen Virginia, Lady Portal, Donor and Organiser of Kingsclere House Auxiliary Hospital, Kingsclere, Newbury
Katharine Frances Wilson Pott, Commandant, Nevill Park Auxiliary Hospital, Tunbridge Wells
Hugh Falkenberg Powell  Late Transport Officer, Cheltenham Group of Hospitals
Lieutenant-Colonel Cecil Du Pre Penton Powney, Divisional Commander, Metropolitan Special Constabulary
Maud Dora Josephine Prendergast, Commandant, Auxiliary Hospital, The Green, Richmond, Surrey
Gertrude Rangeley Stanley Price, Superintendent of Hostels, Ministry of Munitions
Richard Price, Assistant Manager, Inspection of Optical Supplies, Ministry of Munitions, Woolwich Arsenal
Richard John Prichard, Chief Engineer of the Transport Greenore
Herbert Charles Pride, Works Control, Shell Factory, Messrs. White, Allom & Company
Vernon Proctor, Assistant Works Manager at one of Messrs. Cammell Laird & Company's Works
William Clarke Putnam, Minor Staff Officer, Establishment Branch, Ministry of Shipping
James Ramsay, Manager, Erith Works, Messrs. Vickers, Ltd.
Katherine Sarah Marden-Ranger, Donor and Commandant, Oakenshaw Auxiliary Hospital, Surbiton
Lilian Jane Redstone, Historical Records Branch, Ministry of Munitions
Alice day Reed, Commandant, Auxiliary Hospital, Sid-cup, Kent
Harbottle Reed, Commandant in charge of the detraining of patients at Exeter
Captain Frederick William Rees, Master of the Transport Frances Duncan
Georgina Ruth Reeve, Matron, Curative Hospital, Lord Robert's Memorial Workshops
Captain David Alexander Reid, Master of the Oiler Transport Sunik
Phyllis Emily Reiss, Wounded and Missing Enquiry Department, British Red Cross Society
Evangeline Annette Harriett Rendle, Superintendent of Indexing Staff, Procurator-General's Department
Arthur Charles Reynolds, Master of a Trinity House vessel
Henry George Reynolds, Divisional Secretary, Y.M.C.A., South Midland District
Caroline Maud Rhodes, Matron, Woodclyffe Auxiliary Hospital, Wargrave, Berkshire
Francis Bartlett Richards, Assistant Superintendent (Works), Government Rolling Mills, Ministry of Munitions
Annie Catherine Mary Richmond, Assistant Private Secretary to Minister of Labour
Herbert Wheatley Ridsdale, Manager of Whitehead Torpedo Factory, Weymouth
Mary Ritchie, Secretary, Westminster War Savings Committee
Ronald Cleave Roberts, Deputy Principal Clerk, Local Organisation, Ministry of Pensions
Annie Robertson, Welfare Supervisor, The Ebbw Vale Steel, Iron and Coal Company Limited
Mary Elizabette Robertson, Secretary, Innerleithen District War Pensions Committee
Robert Robertson, Executive Officer, Lowestoft Borough Food Control Committee
Elizabeth Street Robinson, Lady Superintendent, Canadian Convalescent Home for Officers, France
Lieutenant-Colonel Robert Hervey St. Clair Robinson, Irish Recruiting Council
Constance Evelyn Robson, Head of Record Department, Queen Mary's Needlework Guild
Elizabeth Jane Roche, Honorary Secretary, Borough of Baling Association of Voluntary Workers
Henry Montague Rogers, Government Office, Isle of Man
Rose Sophia Rogers, Honorary Secretary of Mutford and Lothingland Division, Suffolk Branch, British Red Cross Society
Ethel Blanche Rolfe, Production Officer, Aircraft Supply Department, Ministry of Munitions
Gladys Ethel Ross, Assistant Official, Welsh Region, Ministry of National Service
Letitia Rotton, Temporary Woman Clerk, Ministry of Shipping
Alexander Rule  Late Superintendent, H.M. Wood Distillation Factory, Ministry of Munitions
Alexandra Alberta Russell, Commandant, Dane John Auxiliary Hospital, Canterbury, Kent
The Reverend Cecil Edward Russell, Organiser of Boy Scouts, Labour and Harvest Camps
Mildred Russell, Honorary Secretary and Organiser, Petersfield Division, Hampshire Branch, British Red Cross Society
John Albert Edgar Rusten, Chief Engineer, Mercantile Marine
Edith Smith Ryland, Late Honorary Treasurer, Warwickshire Branch, British Red Cross Society; Commandant, Barford Hill Auxiliary Hospital, Warwick
Elaine Marguerite Salmond, Member of London War Pensions Committee
Howard Lewis Samson, Production Department, British War Mission in U.S.A.
Percy William Sandwell, Deputy Assistant Head Clerk, War Cabinet Secretariat
Joseph Savage, Chemist, The Castner-Kellner Alkali Company Limited
Daniel Benjamin Sheriff Saville, Chief Engineer on Post Office Cable Ship Monarch
Ina Lochhead Scott, Accountant-General's Department, Admiralty
Captain John Scott, Master, Mercantile Marine
Donald Stuart Shaw, Provost of Fort William
Elsie Marie Shaw, Lady Clerk, War Office
John Tresidder Sheppard, Deputy Assistant Censor, War Office
Walter Henry Foster Shipley, Acting Deputy Accounts Officer, Accountant-General's Department, Admiralty
Albert Edward Shorter, Senior Assistant Inspector, Munitions Areas, Sheffield
Samuel Sidebottom, Inspector (Honorary), Surveyor-General of Supplies Department, War Office
James Simcock  Assistant County Director for Heaton Chapel Division, Lancashire Branch, British Red Cross Society
Frederick Simmons, Assistant to the Chairman of the Industries Committee, War Priorities Committee
Captain David Simpson, Master of the Transport Wandby
Richard Edward Skipwith, Technical Assistant to Director of Army Contracts
Quintin Fleming Slater, National Service Representative, Liverpool
Captain Edward Slator, Accountant, British Red Cross Commission, Egypt
Leonard Lansdell Slaughter, Section Commander, Kent Special Constabulary
John Manson Smart, Honorary Secretary, Nairnshire Branch, Scottish Branch, British Red Cross Society
Arthur Ives Smith, Registry Official, Eastern Region, Ministry of National Service
Ernest Arthur Smith, Technical Assistant for Fuel, H.M. Office of Works
Lewis William Smith, Chief Foreman, Howitzer Shop, Messrs. William Beardmore and Company Limited
Noel William Kelland Isbister Smith, Assistant Private Secretary to the Secretary of State for Air
Ethel Downing Smyth, Secretary, Hackney War Savings Committee
John Cecil Smyth  Commandant and Medical Officer, Fairfield Auxiliary Hospital, Malvern
Mabel Janet Soames, Organiser of Red Cross Working Parties and Hospital Sugar Distribution for the County of Wiltshire
Henry Wilkinson Solly, Chief Engineer of the Transport Jabiru
Guy Sparrow, Honorary Central Commissioner, Church Army, Rouen District
Jessie Aubrey Spearman, Organiser of Red Cross Working Parties, Devonshire
William David Spellar, Manager of Red Cross Garages at Ealham and Dulwich
Alfred Spence, Officer-in-Charge of Printing Section, Ministry of Information
Gladys Marion Spencer, Assistant in Photographic Department, Ministry of Information
William Arthur Spencer, Acting 1st Class Assistant Accountant, War Office
Susan Stack, County of Staffordshire Association of Voluntary Workers
James Stan worth, Managing Director, Messrs. J. Stanworth & Brothers
Thomas William Starbuck, Salvation Army
Alfred Steele, Salvation Army
Reginald Johns Steele, Head of Textile Section, Royal Commission on Wheat Supplies
William Lees Stenning  Works Officer, Timber Supplies Department
George Douglas Stevens, Manager, The Chilworth Gunpowder Co., Ltd.
Arnold Stevenson, Chief Chemical and Technical Assistant in the Optical Munitions Department, Ministry of Munitions
Stansmore Leslie Dean Macaulay Stevenson, Scottish Churches Hut, General Headquarters, France
Edward Pakenham Stewart, Ex-soldier Clerk, War Office
Isabella Forbes Stewart, Manager, Scottish Soldiers Club, Rouen
James Stewart, Chief Engineer of the Transport Boukadar
William Alexander Stewart  Executive Officer, City of Aberdeen Food Control Committee
Edward Barlow Stocker, Assistant County Director for Transport, and Joint Honorary Secretary, Nottinghamshire Branch, British Red Cross Society
Swinton Stoddart, Chief Draughtsman, Messrs. Thompson & Sons, Sunderland
Madel Louise Stokes, Matron, No. 2 Anglo-Belgian Red Cross Hospital, Calais
Lieutenant Wilfred Robinson Storey, For an act of gallantry on the occasion of a fire at a Munitions Factory
Ruby Stubbington, Lady Superintendent, The South Metropolitan Gas Company
Robert Wallace Sturgeon, Assistant Secretary, National Maritime Board
Alexander Sutherland, Secretarial Branch, Coal Mines Department, Board of Trade
Kathleen Alice Sutton, Assistant Secretary, Works Construction Sub-Committee, War Priorities Committee
William Swire, Secretary, Fleetwood War Savings Committee
Mabel Edith Swornsbourne, Registrar of Ships and Cargoes, Procurator-General's Department
Captain George Sykes, Royal Air Force Purchasing Department, British War Mission in U.S.A.
William North Symonds, Transport Officer, East Lancashire Branch, British Red Cross Society
Francis Harold Cass Tallack, Commandant of Bearers, London Ambulance Column, British Red Cross Society
Mary Elizabeth Tanner, British Committee, French Red Cross
Richard Frederick Charles Tear, Superintendent, Boundary Department, Ordnance Survey
John Teasdale, Chief Draughtsman, Messrs. Hawthorn, Leslie & Company, Newcastle upon Tyne
Mabel Tebbitt, Quartermaster and Head Cook, St. Mark's Auxiliary Hospital, Broadwater Down, Tunbridge Wells
Elfrida Stella Temple, Voluntary Aid Detachment, Ambulance Driver, British Rei Cross Convoy, Trouville, France
Arnold Thomas, Executive Officer, Hertford Food Control Committee
William Henry Thomas, Founder of the Montenegrin Red Cross and Relief Fund
Captain Frank Thompson, Master of the Transport Ludworth
George Tyrrell Thompson  Master of a Trinity House Vessel
Captain David Thomson, Aeronautical Timber Supplies, British War Mission in U.S.A.
John Thomson, Works Manager, Messrs. Sir William Arrol & Co., Ltd.
Margaret Ellen, Lady Thomson, Vice-President, Hertfordshire Branch, British Red Cross Society
Annie Marion Thome, Assistant Secretary, Small Arms Committee, Ministry of Munitions
Henry Thomas Timbury, Office of Admiral Superintendent, Glasgow
Edith Pelham Tindall, Commandant, Wainfleet Auxiliary Hospital, Lincolnshire
Arthur Bramble Tipping, President of Local Branch of Queen Mary's Needlework Guild, New Orleans
John Thomas Todd, Chairman of the Blackwell Rural District Food Control Committee; Member of the Nottingham City & County Distribution Committee
Edward Sergent Toghill, Purchasing Department, British War Mission in U.S.A.
John Tonkin, Mayor of Truro; Chairman of Local Tribunal, and other local War Committees
Edith Toomer, Head of Motor Ambulance Record Department, British Red Cross Society
Rosalinde Cecil Townley, Commandant, Fulbourne Auxiliary Hospital, Cambridge
Sarah Emuss Trehearne, Queen Mary's Needlework Guild
Major Alfred Bond Trestrail  Commandant, Auxiliary Hospital, Clevedon, Somersetshire
Harry Philip Tufnail, Officer-in-Charge, Havre Motor Ambulance Convoy, British Red Cross Society, France
John Turnbull, Deputy Superintendent at a National Projectile Factory
William Arthur Tutcher, First Class Clerk, Ministry of Pensions
Dorothea Tweedy, Commandant, St. Mary's Auxiliary Hospital, Bromley, Kent
William James Upton, Executive Officer, Bristol Food Control Committee
Catherine Valentine, Queen Mary's Needlework Guild
Emily Eve Lellam Vaux, Late Quartermaster, Hammerton House Auxiliary Hospital, Sunderland
George Edward Sidebottom Venner, Metropolitan Special Constabulary (Observation Service)
Frances Medlicott Vereker, Assistant, Commandant, Salcombe Auxiliary Hospital, Devonshire
Lieutenant Benjamin William Vigo, British Red Cross Society and Order of St. John, Mesopotamia
William Hart Waddingham, Chief Designer, Elswick Ordnance Works
Thomas Wain, Commandant, Red Cross Transport, Chester
Eliza Bagshawe-Walker, District Lady Superintendent, Western District, Central Stores Department, Ministry of Munitions
Captain Percy Walker, Shore Captain, South-Eastern and Chatham Railway, Boulogne
Agnes Kendall Wallace, Honorary Secretary, Wigtownshire Branch, Scottish Branch, British Red Cross Society
John Wallace  Commandant, Ashcombe House Auxiliary Hospital, Weston-super-Mare
John Walters, Administrator of Baldwin's Auxiliary Hospital, Griffithstown, Monmouthshire
Colonel Arthur John Hanslip Ward  Town Clerk of Harwich
Jeannie Wright Ward, Secretary of Recreation Huts, Y.W.C.A., Southern Command
Frances Jane Warrack, Head of the Scottish Churches Club, Boulogne
Edith Mary Warren, Junior Administrative Assistant, Ministry of Shipping
May Constance Flora Waterfield, Superintendent, General Service at Military Hospital, Dartford, Kent
Frances Waterson (to date 4 June 1917.) 
Eva Gordon Watson, Queen Mary's Needlework Guld
Charles Haynes Watts, Collector of Customs and Excise, Grimsby
Captain Arthur Way, Master of the Transport Gregynog
Philip Greville Hugh Way, Secretary, Grantham and Claypole War Savings Committees
John Johnson Weakner, Master of the Institution of the Darlington Union
Avice Webster, Organiser of Voluntary Workers, Woolwich Arsenal
Caroline Rachel Selina Priscilla Weigall, Commandant, Casualty Station, Richborough Camp, Sandgate
Jessie Muriel Kemp-Welch, Commandant, Paddington Auxiliary Hospital, London
Victor Ernest Wells, Salvation Army
George Seton Veitch Wenley, British Red Cross Central Prisoners of War Committee
James Grey West, Assistant Architect, Second Class, H.M. Office of Works
Edith Hilda Wharton, Commandant, Beech Green Auxiliary-Hospital, Withyham, Sussex
Captain Christopher William Wheatley, Late Chief Assistant Director of Aeronautical Supplies, British War Mission in U.S.A.
Florence Louisa Felicia Bourne-Wheeler, Sherwood Foresters Prisoners of War Care Committee
Frances Henrietta Whitaker, Organiser of Red Cross Work in West Belfast
Alfred Kershaw Whitehead, Secretary, Whickham-on-Tyne War Savings Committee
Maude Lillian Whitehead, Commandant, Escrick Park Auxiliary Hospital, Escrick, Yorkshire
Edith Whitt, Teacher of Domestic Subjects in Schools, Local Education Authority, Leeds
Edward Charles Wilford, Temporary Surveyor, War Office
Harry William John Wilkinson, Second Division Clerk, War Office
Albert George Williams, Principal Observer, Optics Division, National Physical Laboratory
William Henry Williams, Treasurer and Honorary Secretary, Bristol Branch, Soldiers' and Sailors' Families Association
William Henry Williams, Managing Director, The Aston Chain and Hook Company Limited
Nellie Pratchett Willmot, Commandant, The Vicarage Auxiliary Hospital, Coleshill, Warwickshire
John William Willoughby, Superintendent, Salford Special Constabulary
Dorothy Holmes Wilson, Superintendent of Registry, War Cabinet Secretariat
Edith Marguerite Wilson, Personal Assistant to the Food Controller
Helen Wilson, Y.M.C.A. Lady Worker, Boulogne
Captain Charles Wilyman, Master of the Transport Andres
Arthur Wellesley Winder  County Director, Auxiliary Hospitals and Voluntary Aid Detachments, County Cork
Arthur Whalesby Windsor, Sub-Section Director, Contracts Department, Ministry of Munitions
Fred Augustus Wing, Head of Controller's Copying Branch, Admiralty
Mildred Marion Winter, Queen Mary's Needlework Guild
William Henry Wood, Timber Supplies Department, Board of Trade
Esther Woodhead, Administrative Assistant, Recruiting Department, Ministry of National Service
Sidney John Woodward, Works Manager, War Refugees Camp, Earl's Court
Hugh Wright, Chief Meat Agent, Meat Supplies Branch, Ministry of Food
Frances Mary Wyld, Commandant, The Club Auxiliary Hospital, Mortimer, Berkshire
Frederick Grant Wynne, Master of a Trinity House Vessel
Alfred Yockney, Secretary to the Pictorial Propaganda Committee
Captain William Edward Young, Divisional Commander, Metropolitan Special Constabulary
Herbert William Younghusband, Temporary Assistant, Naval Sea Transport Department, Ministry of Shipping

British India
Ebrahim Ahmed, alias Be Shwe Mya, Wolfram Mine and Rice Mill-owner, Burma
Juliet Alexander, United Provinces
Henry Armitstead, Deputy Superintendent, Carriage and Wagon Department, North-Western Railway
Shaikh Mahbub Bakhsh, Extra Assistant Commissioner, Soneput, Punjab
Raymond Thomas Barker, Deputy Superintendent of Police, Karachi
Betty Beachcroft, Calcutta National Indian Association Branch of Lady Carmichael War Fund, Bengal, Assistant Commissary and Honorary Lieutenant William Beard, India Miscellaneous List (retired)
Arthur Russell Bennett, Customs Department, Bombay
Margaret Wilke Bhore, Cochin
Shapurji Bomanji Billimoria, Tardeo, Bombay
George Birch, Assistant to Commissioner in Sind
Muriel Black, Red Cross Depot, Lahore, Punjab
Margaret Brent, Bombay
Charles Cecil Trelawny Brereton, District Traffic Superintendent, North-Western Railway, Rawalpindi, Punjab
Frederick Percival Buckner, Superintendent, Foreign and Political Department, Government of India
Bryce Chudleigh Burt, Deputy Director of Agriculture, United Provinces
Maung Maung Bya, A.T.M., Assistant Registrar, Co-operative Societies, Burma
Lala Fateh Chand, Sahni, Extra Assistant Commissioner, Gujrat, Punjab
Pandit Narayan Chand, Zaildar of Khad, Hoshiarpur District, Punjab
Lala Ram Chandar, Chandarnagar, Punjab
Lieutenant Claude Willoughby Cole, Agent, Bank of Madras, Bangalore
Joseph Veasy Collier, Deputy Conservator of Forests, Haldwani, United Provinces
John Cowan, Inspector of Factories, Bengal
Hubert Crawford, Customs Department, Bombay
Charles Arthur Cuttriss, Secretary, Burma Chamber of Commerce
Sunbai Kaikobad Dastur, Women's Branch Depot, Poona
Marion Davidson, Sind Women's Branch Depot, Bombay
Sarojini De Chittagong, Bengal
Kendall Hamilton Dennis, Assistant to Chief Engineer, Bengal and North-Western Railway, Gorakhpur, United Provinces
Walter Clement Goddard Dunne, Court of Wards, Sitapur, United Provinces
Ernest Henry Huish Edye, Indian Civil Service, Assistant Commissioner, Jhansi, United Provinces
Mildred Fanny Eggar, Calcutta National Indian Association Branch of Lady Carmichael's Bengal Women's War Fund, Bengal
Mabel Franklin, Honorary Secretary, Young Men's Christian Association, Multan, Punjab
Sydney Hugh Glackan, Postmaster, Simla 
Bernard Francis Gomes, Indian Telegraph Department
Isabel Greaves, Honorary Secretary, Depot of Lady Carmichael's Bengal, Women's War Fund, Calcutta
Quah Cheng Guan, Municipal Commissioner, Tavoy, Burma
Maulvi Muhammad Savan Habib, Bihar and Orissa
Mian Abdul Hai, Pleader, Ludhiana, Punjab
Frederick Joseph Hall, Government of India Press, India
Ernest Walter Hammond, Inspector of Factories, Bengal
Anita Harvey, Baptist Mission, Calcutta
Robert William Hind, Assistant Honorary Secretary of Dera Ismail Khan Centre of St. John Ambulance Association, North-West Frontier Province
Captain Richard Howard Hitchcock, District Superintendent of Police, Madras (on military duty)
Chaudhri Nabi Jan, Tahsildar, Moradabad, United Provinces
The Reverend Frederick William Jarry, Baptist Missionary, Bihar and Orissa
Thomas White Johnstone, Inspector of Factories, Bombay
Sardar Bahadur Sardar Abdul Rasfaid Khan, Sbahwani, Kalat, Baluchistan
Khan Sahib tinned Mir Khan, Resaldar-Major, Zhob Militia, Baluchistan
Khan Bahadur Ain-ud-Din Khan, Merchant and Honorary Magistrate, Quetta, Baluchistan
Chaudhri Ali Akbar Khan, Extra Assistant Commissioner, Attock, Punjab
Malik Allah Bakhsh Khan, Tiwana, Extra Assistant Commissioner, Gujrat, Punjab
Honorary Captain Malik Ghulam Muhammad Khan, Tiwana, K.B., S.B., Khushab, Punjab
Honorary Captain Subedar-Major Khan Bahadur Kurban Ali Khan, 14th Sikhs, Kamra, Punjab
Khan Bahadur Mohammed Ashraff Khan, Poonch, Kashmir State
Khan Bahadur Munshi Muhammad Ali Khan, Honorary Magistrate, Cawnpore, United Provinces
Khan Bahadur Musa Khan, Provincial Service, North-West Frontier Province
Khan Bahadur Sohbat Khan, Gola Buledi, Baluchistan
Khan Bahadur Sardar Wahab Khan, Panezai Kakar, Baluchistan
Cecil William Kirkpatrick, Superintendent, Foreign and Political Department, Government of India
Captain Lionel Edward Kirwan, 1st Madras Guards, Madras
Malcolm Rataji Kothawala, Deputy Superintendent of Police, Bombay
Louis Patrick Lajoie, Customs and Excise Department, Bikaner State
Chaudihri Kishori Lai, Health Officer, Muttra, United Provinces
Ilinabai Lalkalka, Women's Branch Depot, Bombay
Ernest Lane, Superintendent, Chota Nagpur Mica Syndicate, Kodarma, Bihar and Orissa
Charles Frederick Langer, Controller of Stores, Oudh and Rohilkhand Railway
Frank Langley, Pilot Service, Bengal
John Lapraik, Bank of Bengal, United Provinces
Alexander Samuel Lawrence, Superintendent, Home Department, Government of India
Arthur John Leach, Managing Partner, Taylor & Co.,  Madras
Milton Leach, Jail Department, Bengal
Major Frederick Reginald Lee, Principal, Government School, Taunggyi, Burma
Charles Thomas Letton, Government Central Press, Simla
Surgeon Cecil Henning Lincoln, Acting Consul, Mohammerah, Persian Gulf
Bai Champabahen Manibhai, Shethanij Kapadwanj, Bombay
David Barry Mann, Inspector of Factories, Bengal
Christina May
Duncan Louis McPherson, Eastern Bengal State Railway (Indian-Munitions Board)
Homia Mehta, Calcutta National Indian Association Branch of Lady Carmichael War Fund, Bengal
Shaikh Yakub Vazir Muhammad, Provincial Service, Thar and Parkar, Sind
Bhalchandra Varnan Mule, Sholapur, Bombay
Khagendra Chandra Nag, Secretary, Mymensingh Recruiting Committee, Bengal
Pandit Anand Narayan, Dehra Dun, United Provinces
Rai Bahadur Amar Nath, Sub-Registrar, Lahore, Punjab
Lala Baij Nath, Officiating Civil Surgeon, Jhelum, Punjab
Zoe Ellesmere Davidson Newton, Shiraz, Persia
Malik Sahib Khan Nun, Extra Assistant Commissioner, Gujranwala, Punjab
Maung Nyun, A.T.M., Proprietor, Star of Burma Press, Mandalay, Burma
Captain Malcolm Ostrehan, Assam Military Police
Rajaram Tukaram Padam, Bombay 
Pandit Bhola Dat Pant, Assistant Recruiting Officer, Bareilly
Babu Rajani Kanta Pattadar, Recruiting Agent, Ranchi District, Bihar and Orissa
Dorothy Penuell, Prome, Burma
Winifred Ward Perkins, in charge of Amherst Branch of Red Cross Depot, Burma
John Ruskin Phillips, Locomotive and Carriage Superintendent, Burma Railways
Hari Krishna Pillay, Chetty, President, Madras Hindu Association, Rangoon, Burma
Julian Hugh Price, Deputy Magistrate and Deputy Collector, Cuttack, Bihar and Orissa
Hirabai Pudumji, Women's Branch Depot at Poona, Bombay
Rai Bahadur Biswambhar Rai, Vice-Chairman, District Board, Bengal
Vidhyagouri Ramanbhai, Honorary Secretary of the Women's Branch, Ahmedabad War Relief Fund, Bombay
Charles Herbert Roberts, War Relief Fund, Bombay
Michael Anthony Rozario, in charge of the Records of the Baghdad Residency, Persian Gulf
Commissary and Honorary Major Alfred James Ruegg, India Miscellaneous List, Army Headquarters
Kunvari Rupalbai Saheb, of Limbdi, Bombay
Rai Bahadur Saligram, Ghazipur, United Provinces
Babu Panchanan Sarkar, Rajshahi, Bengal
Bawa Bhag Singh, Extra Assistant Commissioner, Kalsia, Punjab
Lieutenant Ishar Singh, Benares State Service
Munshi Sundar Singh, Honorary Secretary, Gujranwala War League, Punjab
Maude Stewart, War Work Depot, Calcutta
Mary Swan, War Work Depot, Calcutta
Charles Lewis Taylor  Traffic Manager, Oudh and Rohilkhand Railway
Commissary and Honorary Major Thomas Taylor, India Miscellaneous List, Personal Assistant to Chief of General Staff, Army Headquarters
Mesrup Thaddeus, Extra Financial Assistant, Basrah
Commissary and Honorary Major Theophilus Thorne, Indian Ordnance Department, Karachi, Bombay Presidency
Muriel Clara Turner, United Provinces
William Jameson Tomes, Deputy Locomotive Superintendent, Jamalpur, East Indian Railway
Harry Finnis Wagstaff, Retired Merchant, Mussoorie, United-Provinces
Margaret Dewar Walker, Secretary, Railway Section, Gorakhpur Red Cross, United Provinces
Frederick Blunt Wathen, General Traffic Manager, Madras and Southern Mahratta Railway
Honorary Lieutenant-Colonel George Richard Webb  General Stores Superintendent, Great Indian Peninsula Railway
Helen Owen Welman, Library Department, Poona War and Relief Fund, Bombay
May Julia Whitcombe, Women's Branch Depot, Poona, Bombay Presidency
Florence Williamson, Women's Branch Depot, Bombay
Horace Williamson, Superintendent of Police, Allahabad, United Provinces

Egypt
George William Thomas Shapley, Y.M.C.A., Cairo
William Baker Patterson, Sudan Civil Service, attached to the Residency Staff

Sudan

George Wilfred Bennett, Commercial Intelligence Bureau
Robert Victors Bardsley, Sudan Civil Service
Gerald Edwin Warder, Sudan Government Railways and Steamers
Arnold John Forster, Finance Department, Sudan Government

Honorary Members
Sheikh Fuad El Khatib, Official of the Hedjaz Government
Hussein Effendi Ruhi, Arabic Secretary to the British Mission in the Hedjaz
Ayoub Effendi Kemeid, Translator in the Ministry of Finance
Mohammed Bey Wahid El Ayoubi, prominent Egyptian Notable
El Seyyid Abdel Rahim El Demerdash, Member of the Legislative Assembly
Eidarius Bey El Hoot, Omda of Salhia
Mohammed Ali Suliman Bey, Member of the Legislative Assembly
Dr. Ali Effendi Fahmi El Shiati, Principal Medical Officer, Benha Hospital
Sheikh Ahmed El Tayib El Hashim, Grand Mufti, Sudan
Several Sudanese nāẓirs:
Sheikh Ali Tom, Nazir of the Kababish Tribe
Sheikh Ibrahim Musa, Nazir of the Hedendowa Tribe
Sheikh Abdullah Awad El Kerim Abu Sim, Nazir of Shekria Tribe
Sheikh Abdul Azim Bey Khalifa, Nazir of the Ababda Tribe

See also
1919 New Year Honours - Full list of awards.

References

New Year Honours
1919 awards
1919 in Australia
1919 in Canada
1919 in India
1919 in New Zealand
1919 in the United Kingdom